The Woolpackers were an English country rock trio of the 1990s, consisting of Steve Halliwell, Billy Hartman and Alun Lewis, all three of whom were stars of the ITV-produced soap opera Emmerdale, in an attempt to cash in on the popularity of line dancing at the time.

Despite numerous criticisms of their style, the group achieved a hit single with "Hillbilly Rock Hillbilly Roll" in November 1996, reaching number 5 in the UK Singles Chart. The parent album Emmer Dance reached number 26 in the UK Albums Chart a few weeks later. A year later, the single "Line Dance Party" hit number 25 and their second album The Greatest Line Dancing Party reached number 48 in the UK.

Discography

Albums

Singles

Videography
 1996: Emmer Dance, BPI: 2× Platinum

References

Further reading
 Frank Laufenberg: . Frank Laufenbergs rock and pop lexicon vol 2 ,

External links
 
 

British country rock musical groups
Emmerdale